Bezirk Amstetten is a district of the state of 
Lower Austria in Austria.

Municipalities
Towns (Städte) are indicated in boldface; market towns (Marktgemeinden) in italics; suburbs, hamlets and other subdivisions of a municipality are indicated in small characters.
Allhartsberg
Angerholz, Kröllendorf, Kühberg, Maierhofen, Wallmersdorf
Amstetten
Edla, Greinsfurth, Hausmening, Mauer bei Amstetten, Neufurth, Preinsbach, Schönbichl, Ulmerfeld
Ardagger
Ardagger Markt, Ardagger Stift, Kollmitzberg, Stephanshart
Aschbach-Markt
Abetzberg, Aschbach-Dorf, Krenstetten, Mitterhausleiten, Oberaschbach 
Behamberg
Badhof, Penz, Ramingdorf, Wanzenöd
Biberbach
Ennsdorf
Ernsthofen
Aigenfließen, Rubring
Ertl
Euratsfeld
Aigen, Gafring
Ferschnitz
Innerochsenbach
Haag
Edelhof, Gstetten, Heimberg, Holzleiten, Knillhof, Krottendorf, Porstenberg, Radhof, Reichhub, Salaberg, Schudutz
Haidershofen
Brunnhof, Dorf an der Enns, Sträußl, Tröstlberg, Vestenthal
Hollenstein an der Ybbs
Berg, Dornleiten, Garnberg, Grießau, Hohenlehen, Krengraben, Oberkirchen, Oisberg, Sattel, Thalbauer, Thomasberg, Walcherbauer, Wenten
Kematen an der Ybbs
Neuhofen an der Ybbs
Amesleithen, Kornberg, Neuhofen an der Ybbs, Perbersdorf, Scherbling, Schindau, Toberstetten
Neustadtl an der Donau
Berghof, Freyenstein, Hößgang, Kleinwolfstein, Nabegg, Neustadtl-Markt, Neustadtl-Umgebung, Schaltberg, Windpassing
Oed-Öhling
Oed, Öhling
Opponitz
Graben, Gstadt, Hauslehen, Ofenberg, Schwarzenbach, Strubb, Thann
Seitenstetten
Seitenstetten Dorf, Seitenstetten Markt
Sonntagberg
Baichberg, Böhlerwerk, Bruckbach, Gleiß, Hilm, Rosenau am Sonntagberg, Rotte Wühr, Sonntagberg
Sankt Georgen am Reith
Hochau, Kogelsbach, Königsbergau, St. Georgen am Reith
Sankt Georgen am Ybbsfelde
Hart, Hermannsdorf, Krahof, Leutzmannsdorf, Matzendorf, St. Georgen am Ybbsfelde
Sankt Pantaleon-Erla
Erla, St. Pantaleon
Sankt Peter in der Au
Hohenreith, Kürnberg, St. Johann in Engstetten, St. Michael am Bruckbach, St. Peter in der Au-Dorf, St. Peter in der Au-Markt
Sankt Valentin
Altenhofen, Endholz, Hofkirchen, Rems, St. Valentin, Thurnsdorf
Strengberg
Au, Limbach, Ottendorf, Ramsau, Strengberg, Thürnbuch
Viehdorf
Hainstetten, Seisenegg, Viehdorf
Wallsee-Sindelburg
Igelschwang, Ried, Schweinberg, Wallsee
Weistrach
Grub, Hartlmühl, Holzschachen, Rohrbach, Schwaig, Weistrach
Winklarn
Haag Dorf, Winklarn
Wolfsbach
Bubendorf, Meilersdorf, Wolfsbach
Ybbsitz
Großprolling, Haselgraben, Hubberg, Kleinprolling, Knieberg, Maisberg, Prochenberg, Schwarzenberg, Schwarzois, Ybbsitz, Zogelsgraben
Zeillern

References

 
Districts of Lower Austria